Oleg Vladimirovich Naumov (born 1978) is a Russian mass murderer, convicted for the killing of seven people on 26 January 1998, in Sakhalin Oblast.

Background 
Oleg Naumov was born in 1978, and was serving as a private in the Russian Ground Forces, having been conscripted into the military a year before the attack. He was stationed at a military base located in Pobedino, a village on the island of Sakhalin in the Russian Far East region. Naumov had a criminal record and a history of drug abuse from as early as 13-years-old, which was unknown to his commanders at the time.

Attack 
On 26 January 1998, while serving on guard duty, Naumov attacked another soldier at random with an axe before grabbing his automatic rifle, when he then shot dead another soldier on guard duty and his commander, before shooting eight more soldiers in the base cafeteria and in a restroom, killing five of them.

Arrest and conviction 
Naumov fled the base but was detained a few hours later while hiding in a nearby village, and was hospitalized where he was put under heavy sedation. During his interrogation about the crimes at the base, Naumov claimed that he had been high off of acetone vapors, and did not recollect committing the killings.

Private Naumov was sentenced by the Far Eastern Military District Court to life imprisonment in a maximum-security penal colony.

References

1978 births
Living people
20th-century Russian criminals
20th-century Russian military personnel
People convicted of murder by Russia
People from Asbest
People who were court-martialed
Prisoners sentenced to life imprisonment by Russia
Russian people convicted of murder
Russian prisoners sentenced to life imprisonment
Russian soldiers
Russian mass murderers
Russian spree killers
Spree shootings in Russia
1998 mass shootings in Europe